Njan Steve Lopez (English: I am Steve Lopez) is a 2014 Indian Malayalam-language mystery crime film, directed by Rajeev Ravi.  The production is also supported by Jar Pictures, M.R Filmworks and Media Mill. The film is set in Thiruvananthapuram city and It stars Farhaan Faasil and  Ahaana Krishna in lead roles. It was their debut movie as hero and heroine.

Plot 

Steve is a college kid whose major concern in life is how to tell his childhood friend Anjali that he loves her. He has an iPhone, is on WhatsApp all the time, goes out drinking with his friends and generally lives a carefree life made all the more secure by the fact that Steve's father George is a Deputy Superintendent of Police in Thiruvananthapuram.

This idyll is smashed when one day, Steve witnesses a stranger being attacked by men with scythes. Steve isn't able to stop them, but when the attackers leave their victim for dead, Steve takes the injured man to the hospital.

It's here that he realizes there is more than what meets the eye. The man he helped is from a criminal gang and it's evident that George is very unhappy that his son has got mixed up in all this.

Steve's misgivings intensify when he's called to the police station to identify the attackers in a lineup and none of the men he'd seen are in that lineup.

On his way back from the police station, Steve spots one of the scythe-wielding men in a car and decides to follow him. The man whom Steve is following, Hari, seems to be unaware of the college kid tailing him, but of course, that's not really the case. Two of Hari's men knock out Steve. When he comes to his senses, Steve finds himself bound and gagged in a room that overlooks Hari's home. Things become murkier when Hari says he's going to let Steve go and Steve realizes that Hari knows his father.

All Steve wants to do is the right and humane thing by the people he encounters, but his acts of kindness just serve to muddle up the situation he's in terribly. Steve realises George and the police force are somehow involved with the gangs and are playing sides, possibly to maintain a peaceful status quo. However, no matter how many times Steve asks, George won't explain to his son precisely how the police are handling the situations.

Inevitably, Steve realises that the bad guys have human sides and the police have terrible secrets, but no one has answers to the questions that Steve has. The more he investigates this case in which he has unwittingly become a critical pawn, the more dangerous things turn for him. Aside from Steve, no one seems blameless and yet, he is the one who seems to be suffering the most. The film ends with Steve riding his motorcycle down a street with an empty expression on his face, as another motorcycle approaches from behind and the men riding it swing a scythe at Steve's back. The frame freezes just before the scythe connects, leaving Steve's final fate ambiguous.

Cast
 Farhaan Faasil as Steve Lopez
 Ahaana Krishna as Anjali
 Alencier Ley Lopez as George Lopez
 Sujith Shankar as Hari
 Anil Nedumangad as Freddie Lopez
Abhija Sivakala as Anjali (Hari's wife)
 James Elia as Mohanan
 Mini K. S. as Steve's Mother
 Chinnu Kuruvila as Steve's Sister
 Dr. Ambikasuthan as Steve's Grandfather
 Vinayakan as Pratapan

Music

The film score was composed by Chandran Veyattummal and Govind Vasantha (formerly Govind Menon). The songs were composed by Shahabaz Aman and released on 13 July 2014. Chandran Veyattummal also composed the song "Pokaruthen Makane" for the film, which is extracted from the oral text of Iravikutti Pilla Poru.

Online release
The movie was released online on Reelmonk.com to a worldwide audience on 20 July 2015. However, the day of the online release the movie suffered from piracy attacks and was uploaded to torrent sites. The online release partner, Reelmonk, was, however, able to track the uploader within 12 minutes and has initiated criminal proceedings against the pirate.

Reception
The film was very well received by critics like Baradwaj Rangan. But the lack of commercialization made it a failure in the box office. It had since gone through a series of festival circuits gaining more critical acclaim. Finding audience online, now the film has a cult following and is considered Rajeev Ravi's best work among his four films.

References

External links
 

2014 films
2010s Malayalam-language films
Films scored by Chandran Veyattummal
Films scored by Shahabaz Aman
Films set in Kerala
Films shot in Thiruvananthapuram